La Machine à écrire is a three-act play written by French dramatist Jean Cocteau, premiered on 29 April 1941 at the Théâtre Hébertot in Paris.

It has been translated into English as The Typewriter by Ronald Duncan.

Original Cast 
 Fred   Jacques Baumer
 Didier   Louis Salou
 Pascal   Jean Marais
 Maxime   Jean Marais
 Solange   Gabrielle Dorziat
 Margot   Michèle Alfa
  Postmistress  Jandeline

References

External links
A Queer Premiere: Jean Cocteau’s The Typewriter Part of the first chapter of the book The Drama of Fallen France: Reading la Comedie sans Tickets (2012) by Kenneth Krauss. Describes the scandal after the premiere.

Plays by Jean Cocteau